The Monument to Minin and Pozharsky is a bronze statue designed by Ivan Martos and located on the Red Square in Moscow, Russia, in front of Saint Basil's Cathedral. The statue commemorates Prince Dmitry Pozharsky and Kuzma Minin, who gathered an all-Russian volunteer army and expelled the forces of the Polish–Lithuanian Commonwealth under the command of King Sigismund III of Poland from Moscow, thus putting an end to the Time of Troubles in 1612.

The monument was conceived by the Free Society of Lovers of Literature, Science, and the Arts to commemorate the 200th anniversary of those events. Construction was funded by public conscription in Nizhny Novgorod, the city from where Minin and Pozharsky came to save Moscow.  Tsar Alexander I, however, decided the monument should be installed on Red Square next to the Moscow Kremlin rather than in Nizhny Novgorod. The competition for the best design was won by the celebrated sculptor Ivan Martos in 1808. Martos completed a model, which was approved by Dowager Empress Maria Feodorovna and the Russian Academy of Fine Arts in 1813. Casting work using  of copper was carried out in 1816 in St Petersburg. The base, made of three massive blocks of granite from Finland, was also carved at St Petersburg. Moving the statue and base to Moscow presented logistical challenges and was accomplished in winter by using the frozen waterways. However, in the wake of Napoleon's invasion of Russia, the monument could not be unveiled until 1818.

The front of the base carries a bronze plaque depicting a scene of patriotic citizens sacrificing their property for the benefit of the motherland. On the left is an image of the sculptor Martos giving away his two sons (one of whom was killed in 1813). The plaque reads "Гражданину Минину и Князю Пожарскому благодарная Россія. Лѣта 1818", or in English, "In memory of citizens Minin and Grand Duke Pozharsky, in 1818 by grateful Russians".

Originally, the statue stood in the centre of Red Square, with Minin extending his hand towards the Moscow Kremlin. However, after the 1917 Revolution, the Communist authorities found the monument was obstructing parades on the square and discussed its demolition or transfer to some indoor museum. In 1936, the statue was moved closer to the cathedral where it remains to the present day.

On the first celebration of the Unity Day (November 4, 2005) an almost exact copy of this monument by Zurab Tsereteli was erected in Nizhny Novgorod. The copy is 5 cm shorter than the Moscow original.

As it was originally conceived by the sculptor Martos, Prince Pozharsky and Minin were standing side by side. But nobility opposed the concept. It wasn't appropriate for people of different classes to be portrayed on equal terms. Martos redesigned the concept. He has turned the 17th-century heroes of the resistance into ancient history characters. Inequality is highlighted by clothing. Noble prince is in a toga, Minin is in a shirt and trousers.

In 2021-22 the monument underwent an extensive restoration, which was performed without displacing or moving the monument.

References

Minin
Red Square
Minin
Minin
1818 sculptures
Cultural heritage monuments of federal significance in Moscow